Colobostema varicorne is a species of "minute black scavenger fly" or "dung midge" in the family Scatopsidae.

References

Further reading

External links

 

Scatopsidae
Insects described in 1902